The Coltrane Legacy is a compilation album credited to jazz musician John Coltrane, released in 1970 on Atlantic Records, catalogue SD 1553. Issued posthumously, it consists of outtakes from recording sessions which yielded the albums Olé Coltrane, Coltrane Plays the Blues, Coltrane's Sound, and Bags & Trane. All selections were previously unreleased.

The album received a Grammy nomination for Best Jazz Performance.

Reception

In a review for AllMusic, Scott Yanow wrote: "When this LP was released in 1970, it debuted some valuable Coltrane recordings covering a two-year period... Historically significant music, it's generally quite enjoyable."

Track listing
All tracks by John Coltrane except as indicated.

Side one
 "26-2" – 6:13
 "Original Untitled Ballad (To Her Ladyship)" (Billy Frazier) – 8:58
 "Untitled Original (Exotica)" – 5:22

Side two
 "Centerpiece" (Sweets Edison, Bill Tennyson) – 7:05
 "Stairway to the Stars" (Matty Malneck, Mitchell Parish, Frank Signorelli) – 3:58
 "Blues Legacy" (Milt Jackson) – 9:00

Personnel
 John Coltrane – soprano, alto, and tenor saxophone
 Freddie Hubbard – trumpet on "Original Untitled Ballad"
 Eric Dolphy – flute on "Original Untitled Ballad"
 Milt Jackson – vibraphone on side two
 McCoy Tyner – piano on side one
 Hank Jones – piano on side two
 Paul Chambers – bass on side two
 Steve Davis – bass on "26-2" and "Untitled Original"
 Art Davis – bass on "Original Untitled Ballad"
 Elvin Jones – drums on side one
 Connie Kay – drums on side two

References

1970 compilation albums
Atlantic Records compilation albums
John Coltrane compilation albums
Compilation albums published posthumously
Albums produced by Nesuhi Ertegun